Hans Ainson may refer to:
 Hans Ainson (Estonian politician, 1862–1950) 
 Hans Ainson (Estonian politician, 1897–1980)